Sròn a’ Choire Ghairbh is a Scottish mountain situated on the northern side of Loch Lochy, 13 kilometres north of Spean Bridge in the Highland Council area.

Overview
Sròn a’ Choire Ghairbh reaches a height of 937 metres (3074 feet) and is classified as both a Munro and a Marilyn. It is highest of the Loch Lochy hills and is invariably climbed along with the neighbouring Munro of Meall na Teanga to which it is joined by the distinctive col of the Cam Bhealach. Both these hills which are often referred to as the Loch Lochy Munros are well seen from the A82 road on the opposite side of the loch, showing steep slopes which are forested below the 300 metre contour. There are also extensive conifer plantings on the lower northern (Glen Garry) side of the mountain, this is gradually being restored to native species. The hills name translates from the Gaelic as The Nose of the Rough Corrie referring to the summits location on the edge of the craggy Coire Glas, which stands to the east.

Geography
Sròn a’ Choire Ghairbh’s main geographical feature is the Coire Glas which has the small Loch a’ Choire Ghlais within its upper recesses. The mountain is horse shoe shaped and throws down two ridges on either side of the corrie, the lengthy east ridge is five kilometres long and goes over the two subsidiary tops of Sean Mheall (888 metres) and Meall nan Dearcag (693 metres) before descending to the Kilfinnan Burn at the north end of Loch Lochy. Another ridge called Meall a’ Choire Ghlais goes north and then north east along the other side of Corrie Glas, it loses very little height for two kilometres before descending steeply and rockily to the Beallach Easain (548 metres) which connects it to the Corbett Ben Tee.

In all other directions the mountain is steep and grassy, to the south lies the Cam Beallach, a mountain pass that links to the Munro Meall na Teanga, the Cam Beallach is seen as a distinct notch in the skyline between the two Munros whether viewed from the east or the west. To the north is the small Coire an Eich which drains north into Glen Garry to find its way to the sea at the east coast via Loch Ness. Sròn a’ Choire Ghairbh is actually on the main north-south water divide of Scotland with rainfall on all other parts of the hill going to the west coast via Loch Lochy and Loch Linnhe.

A 1.5 GW pumped-storage hydroelectricity project storing 24 hours of power is planned to connect Coire Glas with Loch Lochy.

Ascents
Sròn a’ Choire Ghairbh is nearly always climbed from the Cam Beallach, however there are two possible ways of arriving there. The southern approach starts at the car park at the Eas Cia-aig waterfall on the B8005 at grid reference , Gleann Cia-aig is ascended to its head where the Cam Beallach is clearly in view
. The approach from the north east starts at the car park at Laggan Locks just off the A82 at grid reference  and takes the rising track through the forest on Loch Lochy’s northern side to reach the Cam Beallach. The continuation to the summit from the Cam Beallach follows a very good stalkers path which zig zags up the mountainside to the highest point which overlooks Coire Glas. The mountain has a substantial prominence of 622 metres ensuring that the summit is a fine viewpoint for the surrounding mountains of Lochaber and beyond.

Sròn a’ Choire Ghairbh is one of the few hills in Scotland that has a visitors book at its summit (Mam Sodhail being one of the others). The book is kept in a coffee jar inside a wooden box and is maintained by Richard Wood of Invergarry.

The two Loch Lochy Munros are sometimes climbed by travellers on the Great Glen Way between Fort William and Inverness, the two hills offering variety on what is a low level multi day walk.

References and footnotes
 The Munros, Scottish Mountaineering Trust, 1986, Donald Bennet (Editor) 
 The High Mountains of Britain and Ireland, Diadem, 1993, Irvine Butterfield, 
 Hamish’s Mountain Walk, Baton Wicks, 1996, Hamish Brown, 
 The Munro - Scotland's Highest Mountains, 2006,  Cameron McNeish, 
Footnotes

Munros
Marilyns of Scotland
Mountains and hills of the Northwest Highlands